The Cranbrook Daily Townsman is the local daily newspaper of Cranbrook, British Columbia, Canada. It is owned by Victoria-based Black Press, the largest publisher of weekly newspapers in British Columbia.

The Daily Townsman is the paper of record for Cranbrook. During the Covid-19 pandemic it publishes once a week, on Tuesday. Its Thursday product, the Kootenay News Advertiser, distributes to  several outlying communities in the East Kootenay region. Originally a weekly newspaper, it has published daily since 1946. In 2016, it began publishing three times a week.

Don Kendall, a former executive at Black Press, purchased the Daily Townsman and Kimberly Daily Bulletin in July 2010, as part of a larger deal that saw Glacier Media sell several of its British Columbia papers to Black. At the time, Kendall said Black "wasn't as interested in some titles – Cranbrook, Kimberley, Nelson, and Prince Rupert – but Glacier was only selling the papers as a block."

Black did purchase the Nelson Daily News and Prince Rupert Daily News in 2010, and ended up closing them days later. It already owned competing weeklies in both Nelson and Prince Rupert.

Although it also owns a competing weekly in Cranbrook, the Kootenay Advertiser, Black purchased the Daily Townsman and Daily Bulletin from Kendall a year later, promising that both the weekly and the dailies "will continue to run under their current business plan and we anticipate few changes."

All of Black's community newspapers in the East Kootenay region are printed on the Daily Townsman'''s presses.

See alsoKimberley Daily Bulletin''
List of newspapers in Canada

References

External links
Cranbrook Daily Townsman| – Official website.
The website has now changed to https://www.cranbrooktownsman.com/

Mass media in Cranbrook, British Columbia
Publications established in the 1920s
Daily newspapers published in British Columbia
Publications with year of establishment missing